Chimney's Afire is the second studio album by Australian singer-songwriter Josh Pyke. It was released in October 2008 and peaked at number 3 on the ARIA Charts and was certified gold.

At the ARIA Music Awards of 2009, the album was nominated for two awards, winning ARIA Award for Best Adult Contemporary Album.

Reception

AllMusic said "Chimney's Afire is ironically anything but afire, with decidedly safe music throughout. Pyke doesn't quite sound like anyone else, to his credit, but the music is strangely familiar and formulaic at the same time. There's a careful composition skill at work in the creation of these pieces, that makes ballads and pop ditties with equal aplomb and yet refuses to stand out at all from the other songs, or from other music on the market. Just a couple of tracks hold any reasonable energy – 'Make You Happy' which holds a bit of mid-'90s American contemporary rock to it, and 'You Don't Scare Me' which starts out with a thumping Ramones-style beat, but moves into a silky vocal line, something that Jonathan Coulton might have used in a parody of contemporary music. There's serious ability within Pyke's work, and yet the execution provides nothing of lasting impact. Use it for excellent ambient background music, but don't expect to be blown away."

Track listing

Charts

Certification

Release history

References 

2008 albums
Josh Pyke albums
Ivy League Records albums
ARIA Award-winning albums